West Hatch is a hamlet and civil parish in Somerset, England, situated  south east of Taunton in the Somerset West and Taunton district.  It has a population of 306.

History
The name of the hamlet indicates it lies to the west of Hatch Beauchamp.

The parish of West Hatch was part of the North Curry Hundred. The manor, along with North Curry, was granted to the Bishop of Wells by Richard I in 1189 and then to the dean and chapter of Wells Cathedral.

West Hatch has been the home of an RSPCA Little Creech centre since 1963, when the 17th century farm was purchased for the charity. A new purpose-built centre was constructed in 1997. During the cleanup operation after the beaching of the MSC Napoli cargo ship off the coast of Devon in January 2007, the majority of seabirds covered in oil were sent to the West Hatch RSPCA to be cleaned. It is one of two RSPCA centres in the UK used for this purpose and its work is often featured on national television.

Governance
The parish council has responsibility for local issues, including setting an annual precept (local rate) to cover the council’s operating costs and producing annual accounts for public scrutiny. The parish council evaluates local planning applications and works with the local police, district council officers, and neighbourhood watch groups on matters of crime, security, and traffic. The parish council's role also includes initiating projects for the maintenance and repair of parish facilities, as well as consulting with the district council on the maintenance, repair, and improvement of highways, drainage, footpaths, public transport, and street cleaning. Conservation matters (including trees and listed buildings) and environmental issues are also the responsibility of the council.

The hamlet falls within the non-metropolitan district of Somerset West and Taunton, which was established on 1 April 2019. It was previously in the district of Taunton Deane, which was formed on 1 April 1974 under the Local Government Act 1972, and part of Taunton Rural District before that. The district council is responsible for local planning and building control, local roads, council housing, environmental health, markets and fairs, refuse collection and recycling, cemeteries and crematoria, leisure services, parks, and tourism.

Somerset County Council is responsible for running the largest and most expensive local services such as education, social services, libraries, main roads, public transport, policing and  fire services, trading standards, waste disposal and strategic planning.

It is also part of the Taunton Deane county constituency represented in the House of Commons of the Parliament of the United Kingdom. It elects one Member of Parliament (MP) by the first past the post system of election.

Religious sites
The parish Church of St Andrew dates from the 15th century, but was extensively restored in 1861 when the north aisle and probably the vestry and organ bay were added by Benjamin Ferrey. The church was rededicated by Bishop Jim Thompson on 10 May 1992. From 1846-1849 the curate was Charles Parish, subsequently a noted botanist and plant collector.

Notable residents
 John Collins VC DCM MM (1880–1951), an English recipient of the Victoria Cross, was born in the village.

References

External links

Villages in Taunton Deane
Civil parishes in Somerset